Wellford is a city in Spartanburg County, South Carolina, United States. The population was 2,378 at the 2010 census, up from 2,030 in 2000.

History
Wellford was founded in 1840 by a man named Wellington, who was building a railroad in the area. He settled and named the town Wellington. When the town was chartered on December 9, 1882, the name was changed to Wellford.

New Hope Farm was listed on the National Register of Historic Places in 1999.

Geography
Wellford is located at  (34.951087, -82.098497).

According to the United States Census Bureau, the city has a total area of 2.0 square miles (5.3 km2), all land.

Demographics

2020 census

As of the 2020 United States census, there were 3,293 people, 944 households, and 646 families residing in the city.

2000 census
As of the census of 2000, there were 2,030 people, 822 households, and 571 families residing in the city. The population density was 993.8 people per square mile (384.2/km2). There were 910 housing units at an average density of 445.5 per square mile (172.2/km2). The racial makeup of the city was 48.92% African American, 46.70% White,  0.39% Native American, 0.34% Asian, 2.32% from other races, and 1.33% from two or more races. Hispanic or Latino of any race were 3.60% of the population.

There were 822 households, out of which 25.7% had children under the age of 18 living with them, 39.2% were married couples living together, 25.2% had a female householder with no husband present, and 30.5% were non-families. 25.4% of all households were made up of individuals, and 9.2% had someone living alone who was 65 years of age or older. The average household size was 2.47 and the average family size was 2.94.

In the city, the population was spread out, with 23.8% under the age of 18, 10.0% from 18 to 24, 29.7% from 25 to 44, 21.6% from 45 to 64, and 14.9% who were 65 years of age or older. The median age was 36 years. For every 100 females, there were 82.9 males. For every 100 females age 18 and over, there were 81.4 males.

The median income for a household in the city was $32,426, and the median income for a family was $36,020. Males had a median income of $31,719 versus $22,756 for females. The per capita income for the city was $16,593. About 8.6% of families and 12.3% of the population were below the poverty line, including 10.6% of those under age 18 and 10.2% of those age 65 or over.

References

External links
Information about the Town of Wellford

Cities in South Carolina
Cities in Spartanburg County, South Carolina
Populated places established in 1840